The Dodoma Convention Centre is a convention centre in the Tanzanian capital of Dodoma. It was inaugurated by President Jakaya Kikwete on 9 July 2015.

References

External links
 

Convention centres in Tanzania
Buildings and structures in Dodoma
Chama Cha Mapinduzi